Kurt Müller may refer to:

 Kurt Müller (field hockey) (born 1928), Swiss Olympic hockey player
 Kurt Müller (footballer) (born 1948), Swiss former footballer
 Kurt Müller (sport shooter) (born 1934), Swiss sports shooter
 Kurt Müller (officer), commander of the 286th Security Division (Wehrmacht) during World War II